The eye-ringed flatbill (Rhynchocyclus brevirostris) is a species of bird in the family Tyrannidae. It is found in Belize, Colombia, Costa Rica, El Salvador, Guatemala, Honduras, Mexico, Nicaragua, and Panama, with a slight incursion into Colombia at the south end of its range. Its natural habitats are subtropical or tropical moist lowland forests and subtropical or tropical moist montane forests.

The Pacific flatbill (R. pacificus) is sometimes still considered a subspecies of R. brevirostris.

This species measures . It has olive-green upperparts and green streaked breast grading to a yellowish belly and white vent. Then tail is also green. Its face is grey with a prominent white eye ring. The short, flat bill is bicolored, with the upper mandible dark grey and the lower mandible pinkish orange.

The call is a sharp .

References

Further reading

External links

 
 
 
 
 
 

eye-ringed flatbill
Birds of Central America
eye-ringed flatbill
Taxonomy articles created by Polbot